Sense and Sensuality (1982) was the second and last album by British post-punk band Au Pairs. The album reached #79 in Britain. No singles were released from the album. The album cover wasn't approved by the band. The lyrics focus on personal and wider political issues, but show a greater range of musical influences, than their first album Playing with a Different Sex.

Track listing
All tracks composed by Lesley Woods, Paul Foad, Jane Munro and Peter Hammond.

"Don't Lie Back"    
"(That's When) It's Worth It"    
"Instant Touch"    
"Sex Without Stress"    
"Fiasco"    
"Intact"    
"Tongue In Cheek"    
"Stepping Out Of Line"    
"Shakedown"    
"America"

Charts

Personnel

Band
Lesley Woods – guitar, vocals
Paul Foad – guitar, cello, vocals
Jane Munro – bass
Peter Hammond – drums, percussion

Additional musicians
Chris Lee – trumpet
James Johnstone & Olly Moore – saxophones
Keith Knowles & John Suddick – synthesizers
Milt Hampton – Vibraphone>

Production
Au Pairs – producer
Terry Barham – engineer
Ken Thomas – engineer

Notes

External links and sources 

Au Pairs (band) albums
1982 albums